Nöjesguiden (Swedish for "the entertainment guide") is a Nordic free-of-charge young adult monthly magazine, available in the major cities in Sweden, which was established in 1982. 

It is also published with similar format In Finland under the name City-lehti and in Norway under the name Natt og Dag.

Editors-in-chief
1982 – 1991 Ajje Ljungberg (founder)
1991 – 1995 Mattias Hansson (Stockholm)
1991 – 1994 Johan Croneman (Gothenburg/Malmö) 
1991 – 1995 Martin Theander (Malmö/Gothenburg)  
1994 –1996 Clara Mannheimer
1996 – 1999 Martin Jönsson 
1999 – 2007 Daniel Sparr 
2007 – 2008 Hannes Dükler 
2008 – 2013 Margret Atladottir 
2013 – 2015 Amat Levin 
 2015 – 2018 Jenny Nordlander 
2018 – Pelle Tamleht

References

External links
 Nöjesguiden's website (Swedish)

1982 establishments in Sweden
Free magazines
Listings magazines
Magazines established in 1982
Magazines published in Stockholm
Monthly magazines published in Sweden
Swedish-language magazines
Youth magazines